"Fifteen Minutes" is an episode of the BBC sitcom, The Green Green Grass. It was first screened on 7 December 2007, as the fifth episode of series three.

Synopsis

Boycie can't believe that his staff are auditioning for a reality TV show, but the lure of fame proves too much for him resist. Meanwhile, Marlene has some plans of her own for when he's away resulting in confusion when Boycie returns home in a hurry.

Episode cast

Continuity
The production company in this episode is called "Salop TV", "Salop" being an alternative name for Shropshire.

References

British TV Comedy Guide for The Green Green Grass
BARB viewing figures

2007 British television episodes
The Green Green Grass episodes